Two Gentlemen Sharing is a 1969 British drama film directed by Ted Kotcheff, written by Evan Jones, and starring Robin Phillips, Judy Geeson, Esther Anderson, Hal Frederick, Norman Rossington and Rachel Kempson.

The film cost an estimated £380,000 to make.

Premise
An upper-class white Englishman is forced to confront his own feelings and prejudices when the London flat he advertises for sharing is taken up by an Oxford-educated black Jamaican.

Cast
Robin Phillips as Roddy
Judy Geeson as Jane
Esther Anderson as Caroline
Hal Frederick as Andrew
Norman Rossington as Phil
Rachel Kempson as Mrs. Ashby-Kydd
Ram John Holder as Marcus
Hilary Dwyer as Ethne
Daisy Mae Williams as Amanda
Philip Stone as Ethne's father
Elspeth March as Ethne's mother
Avice Landone as Roddy's mother
David Markham as Roddy's father
Shelagh Fraser as Jane's mother
Earl Cameron as Jane's father

Critical reception
Variety wrote, "Film boasts a solid and well-chosen cast, strong physical values for such a medium-scaled item, and a racial story [from a novel by David Stuart Leslie] delivered with unhysterical acumen and, at times, with considerable barbed humor."

References

External links

1969 films
1969 drama films
American International Pictures films
British drama films
Films about race and ethnicity
Films based on British novels
Films set in London
Films scored by Stanley Myers
1960s English-language films
Films directed by Ted Kotcheff
1960s British films